The following are the association football events of the year 1888 throughout the world.

Events
February 1 - Royal Arsenal move to Manor Ground, their first permanent stadium, playing their first match there, against Millwall Rovers.
March 23 - A meeting of 12 clubs at Anderson's Hotel in London on the eve of the FA Cup Final, convened by Aston Villa's William McGregor, discusses the possibility of a national football league competition.
April 17 - A further meeting at Manchester's Royal Hotel leads to the competition being named The Football League.
September 8 - The first Football League matches are played, marking the 1st season in the Football League.

Clubs founded in 1888
Barnet
Celtic
Dartford
Sparta Rotterdam
Walsall

Winners club national cup

Asia

Europe

Winners club national leagues
 No national leagues existed prior to 1888, when the English Football League was founded. The first champions, Preston North End, emerged in the spring of 1889.

International tournaments 
1888 British Home Championship (February 4 – April 7, 1888)

1888 Football World Championship (May 19, 1888)

Births
 11 March – Hermann Garrn (d. 1966), German international footballer.
 23 July – Jimmy Gordon (d. 1954), Scotland international half-back in ten matches (1912–1920).
 24 August – Leo Bosschart (d. 1951), Dutch international footballer.
 6 December – Wilhelm Trautmann (d. 1969), German international footballer.

References

 
Association football by year